The Lobster Pot is a restaurant in Provincetown, Massachusetts in the United States. 

Anthony Bourdain worked there as a dishwasher early in his career. The restaurant was famous not just for its seafood but also its steak. It was opened in 1979 by the McNulty family. In January 2023, it was announced the Lobster Pot was for sale for $14 million. The price includes the brand, land, business, equipment and buildings.

It is open seasonally, from April until November.

In popular culture
The Lobster Pot was featured on an episode of the television series Anthony Bourdain: Parts Unknown.

References

Restaurants in Massachusetts
Provincetown, Massachusetts
Seafood restaurants in Massachusetts